Nikolas Cox (born 15 January 2002) is an Australian rules footballer who plays for the Essendon Bombers in the Australian Football League (AFL). He was recruited by Essendon with the 8th draft pick in the 2020 AFL draft. He is the son of former VFL player Darryl Cox.

Early football
Cox played football for the Montmorency Football Club in the Northern Football Netball League. He began playing for the Northern Knights in 2019, and had his 2020 season cancelled due to the impact of the COVID-19 pandemic. During his 2019 season with the Knights, he kicked 9 goals from 10 games, and averaged 12.5 disposals and 4.9 marks a game. Cox represented Vic Metro in the 2019 AFL Under 18 Championships.

AFL career
On debut, Cox collected 9 disposals, 3 marks and 1 tackle. He was reported for striking Hawthorn player Oliver Hanrahan, and fined $2000. Cox obtained a Rising Star nomination in round 12 of the season, after he collected 23 disposals and kicked a goal. Cox is likely to miss the rest of the 2022 season after sustaining a Lisfranc injury in May. The young Bomber signed a two-year extension in June that ties him to the club until the end of 2024.

Statistics
 Statistics are correct to the end of round 4, 2021.

|- style="background-color: #EAEAEA"
! scope="row" style="text-align:center" | 2021
|
| 13 || 4 || 3 || 3 || 31 || 26 || 57 || 17 || 10 || 0.75 || 0.75 || 7.75 || 6.5 || 14.25 || 4.25 || 2.5
|- class="sortbottom"
! colspan=3| Career
! 4 
! 3 
! 3 
! 31 
! 26 
! 57 
! 17 
! 10 
! 0.75 
! 0.75 
! 7.75 
! 6.5 
! 14.25 
! 4.25 
! 2.5
|}

Personal life
He cited his favourite player from Essendon to watch as Alwyn Davey. Cox attended Ivanhoe Grammar School.
 
Cox has 2 sisters, Alexandra (Ally) and Montana. His sister, Montana Cox is a fashion model and a past winner of the Australia's Next Top Model reality television show.

References

2002 births
Living people
Essendon Football Club players
Northern Knights players
Australian rules footballers from Victoria (Australia)
People educated at Ivanhoe Grammar School